Hàm Ninh may refer to several places in Vietnam, including:

Hàm Ninh, Kiên Giang, a rural commune of Phú Quốc
Hàm Ninh, Quảng Bình, a rural commune of Quảng Ninh District